A thoroughfare is a road or way for travel between places

Thoroughfare may also refer to:

Places
 Thoroughfare, New Jersey, United States
 Thoroughfare, Newfoundland and Labrador, Canada
 Thoroughfare, Virginia, United States
 Thoroughfare Gap (Bull Run Mountain), a water gap in the Bull Run Mountains
 Thoroughfare Gap Battlefield, an  American Civil War battlefield in the gap
 Central Arc Thoroughfare, is a semicircular chain of streets in Saint Petersburg, Russia
 Łazienkowska Thoroughfare, a road in Warsaw, Poland

See also
 No Thoroughfare
 Thoroughfare Gap